Zachary Tepaia Payne (born 18 November 1993 in Rarotonga, Cook Islands) is a swimmer from the Cook Islands and freestyle specialist. He competed in the 50 m event at the 2012 Summer Olympics.
His middle name, Tepaia, means "strong zephyr" in Rarotongan, the most widely spoken maori language on the islands.

References

External links
 

1993 births
Living people
Cook Island male freestyle swimmers
Olympic swimmers of the Cook Islands
Swimmers at the 2012 Summer Olympics